Christine Macel (born 1969) is a French curator. She was the director of the 2017 Venice Biennale, and is chief curator at the Centre Pompidou.

Early life
Christine Macel was born in Paris in 1969.

Career 
Macel is a contributor to several magazines such as Artforum, Flash Art, Art Press, Parkett and Cahiers du Musée national d'art moderne.

Macel has served as the Chief Curator at the Centre Pompidou since 2000, where she started the museum's contemporary art department. She has curated shows for Sophie Calle, Gabriel Orozco, Nan Goldin, and Philippe Parreno.

At the Venice Biennale, Macel curated the French pavilion in 2013 (Anri Sala), and the Belgian pavilion in 2007 (Eric Duyckaerts).

In 2022, Macel was appointed director of the Musée des Arts Décoratifs in Paris.

References

Further reading 

 
 

1969 births
Living people
Venice Biennale artistic directors
French art curators
French women curators